Richard Lawrence Garwin (born April 19, 1928) is an American physicist, best known as the author of the first hydrogen bomb design.

In 1978, Garwin was elected a member of the National Academy of Engineering for contributing to the application of the latest scientific discoveries to innovative practical engineering applications contributing to national security and economic growth.

Education
Garwin received his bachelor's degree from the Case Institute of Technology in 1947, and two years later his Ph.D. from the University of Chicago under the supervision of Enrico Fermi at the age of 21. Another of Fermi's students, Marvin L. Goldberger, claims that Fermi said that "Garwin was the only true genius he had ever met".

Career
After graduating from the University of Chicago, Garwin joined the physics faculty there and spent summers as a consultant to Los Alamos National Laboratory working on nuclear weapons. Garwin was the author of the actual design used in the first hydrogen bomb (code-named Mike) in 1952. He was assigned the job by Edward Teller, with the instructions that he was to make it as conservative a design as possible in order to prove the concept was feasible. He also worked on the development of the first spy satellites, for which he was named one of the ten founders of national reconnaissance. While at IBM, his work on spin-echo magnetic resonance laid the foundations for MRI; he was the catalyst for the discovery and publication of the Cooley–Tukey FFT algorithm, today a staple of digital signal processing; he worked on gravitational waves; and played a crucial role in the development of laser printers and touch-screen monitors. He has been granted 47 patents and has published over 500 papers.

In December 1952, he joined IBM's Watson laboratory, where he worked continuously until his retirement in 1993. He is currently IBM Fellow Emeritus at the Thomas J. Watson Research Center in Yorktown Heights, New York. During his career Garwin divided his time between applied research, basic science, and consulting to the U.S. Government on national-security matters. Parallel to his appointment at IBM, at different periods he held an adjunct professorship in physics at Columbia University; an appointment as the Andrew D. White Professor-at-Large at Cornell University; and a professorship in public policy, and in physics, at Harvard University.<ref>Brennan, Jean Ford, [http://www.columbia.edu/acis/history/brennan/ The IBM Watson Laboratory at Columbia University: A History], IBM, Armonk, New York, February 18, 1971. Cf. pp.31-43. "By the end of 1952, Richard L. Garwin, a former pupil of Professor Enrico Fermi, had come to the Lab from the University of Chicago where he had been an assistant professor of nuclear physics."</ref> He has also been the Philip D. Reed Senior Fellow at the Council on Foreign Relations in New York, NY.

Garwin served on the U.S. President's Science Advisory Committee from 1962–65 and 1969–72, under Presidents Kennedy, Johnson, and Nixon. He has been a member of the JASON Defense Advisory Group since 1966. As a member of the Institute for Defense Analyses' Jason Division of U.S. university scientists. on Sat. February 3, 1968, Garwin “traveled to Vietnam” with Henry Way Kendall and several other scientists “to check on the operation of the electronic barrier” he and other Jason scientists developed for the Pentagon to utilize in Indochina, according to The Jasons by Ann Finkbeiner. And, in the 1960s, "Jason scientist Richard Garwin, a nuclear physicist who, years before, helped design the Castle Bravo hydrogen bomb, held a seminar on the SADEYE cluster bomb and other munitions that would be most effective when accompanying the sensors" of the electronic barrier in Vietnam, according to page 205 of Annie Jacobsen's book, "The Pentagon's Brain: An Uncensored History of DARPA, America's Top Secret Military Research Agency," that Little Brown & Company, NY published in 2015. From 1993 to August 2001, he chaired the Arms Control and Nonproliferation Advisory Board of the U.S. Department of State. From 1966 to 1969 he served on the Defense Science Board. He also served on the Commission to Assess the Ballistic Missile Threat to the United States in 1998. He is currently a member of the National Academies' Committee on International Security and Arms Control and has served on 27 other National Academies committees.

In 2017, science journalist Joel N. Shurkin published a biography of Garwin, True Genius: The Life and Work of Richard Garwin, in which Shurkin writes about "the most influential scientist you never heard of."

Honors
Garwin received the National Medal of Science, the United States' highest honor for the fields of science and engineering (award year 2002), for "his research and discoveries in physics and related fields, and of his longstanding service to the Nation by providing valuable scientific advice on important questions of national security over a half a century." He also received the equivalent, La Grande Médaille de l'Académie des Sciences, from France for his role in discovering parity violation in pion decay. He is among a select few scientists to have been elected to all three U.S. National Academies: the National Academy of Sciences (elected 1966), the National Academy of Medicine (1975), and the National Academy of Engineering (1978). He was also a member of both the American Academy of Arts and Sciences (1969) and the American Philosophical Society (1979). In 2016, President Barack Obama honored Garwin with a Presidential Medal of Freedom. Garwin also received 1988 AAAS Award for Scientific Freedom and Responsibility and the Golden Plate Award of the American Academy of Achievement in 1997.

See also
Accelerator-driven subcritical reactor
Energy amplifier
Laura Garwin, science journalist and trumpeter, Garwin's daughterMegawatts and Megatons''

References

External links
Annotated Bibliography for Richard Garwin from the Alsos Digital Library for Nuclear Issues 
Dr. Richard Garwin's personal website
The Garwin Archive at the Federation of American Scientists
Oral History interview transcript with Richard Garwin 23 October 1986, American Institute of Physics, Niels Bohr Library and Archives 
Oral History interview transcript with Richard Garwin 7 June 2001, American Institute of Physics, Niels Bohr Library and Archives 
Oral History interview transcript with Richard Garwin 24 June 1991, American Institute of Physics, Niels Bohr Library and Archives 

The Problem-Solver: A Portrait Of Physicist Richard Garwin - Science Friday, 28 April 2017 (Ira Flatow interview with Joel Shurkin)

American nuclear physicists
21st-century American physicists
Case Western Reserve University alumni
Columbia University faculty
Cornell University faculty
Enrico Fermi Award recipients
IBM Fellows
Jewish American scientists
Living people
Members of JASON (advisory group)
Members of the United States National Academy of Engineering
Members of the United States National Academy of Sciences
Members of the National Academy of Medicine
Fellows of the American Academy of Arts and Sciences
Fellows of the American Association for the Advancement of Science
Members of the American Philosophical Society
National Medal of Science laureates
Scientists from Cleveland
Presidential Medal of Freedom recipients
University of Chicago alumni
1928 births
Industry and corporate fellows
21st-century American Jews